Giuseppina Di Blasi (born 14 January 1979) is an Italian archer. She competed in the women's individual and team events at the 1996 Summer Olympics.

References

1979 births
Living people
Italian female archers
Olympic archers of Italy
Archers at the 1996 Summer Olympics
People from Menfi
Sportspeople from the Province of Agrigento